Matti Pietinen (3 March 1859, in Sumiainen – 27 April 1918, in Viipuri; original surname Pitkänen) was a Finnish schoolteacher, factory owner and politician. He was a member of the Diet of Finland from 1904 to 1906 and of the Parliament of Finland from 1910 to 1913, representing the Young Finnish Party.

Being a prominent supporter of the White side, he was arrested by Red Guards during the Finnish Civil War and shot in Viipuri on 27 April 1918, as White troops were preparing to storm the city.

References

1859 births
1918 deaths
People from Äänekoski
People from Vaasa Province (Grand Duchy of Finland)
Young Finnish Party politicians
Members of the Diet of Finland
Members of the Parliament of Finland (1910–11)
Members of the Parliament of Finland (1911–13)
Finnish schoolteachers
People of the Finnish Civil War (White side)
People executed by Finland by firearm